Padiham is a town and a civil parish in the borough of Burnley, Lancashire, England.  The parish contains 29 buildings that are recorded in the National Heritage List for England as designated listed buildings. Of these, two are listed at Grade II*, the middle grade, and the others are at Grade II, the lowest grade.  The parish consists of the town of Padiham and surrounding countryside.

At first Padiham was a market town, but following the Industrial Revolution a number of cotton mills were built.  Most of the older listed buildings are farmhouses and farm buildings.  The later listed buildings include houses, some of them in rows, churches and associated structures, a lodge at the entrance of a drive to Gawthorpe Hall, banks, a former school master's house, the town hall, and township boundary stones.

Key

Buildings

References

Citations

Sources

Buildings and structures in Burnley
Lists of listed buildings in Lancashire
Padiham